is a man-made irrigation reservoir with a reserve capacity of 15.4 million tons, located in the town of Mannō, Kagawa, Japan, on the island of Shikoku. It is vaguely shaped like a human hand. Around the lake is a forest of Japanese red pine, sawtooth oak, and konara oak, and 75 species of birds, including goshawks and sparrowhawks, as well as 12 species of wild animals, including Japanese squirrels. Due to the importance of the habitat, 321 hectares has been designated as a wildlife sanctuary by Kagawa Prefecture .

History
701-704 (Taihō era ) Michimori Ason, the lord of Sanuki Province, erects the first dam.  It was originally called Kaminoike because it was located in Kaminogo, but in the early Heian period, when Emperor Saga ascended the throne, it was changed to Manoike because prior to ascending the throne the emperor's name was Imperial Prince Kamino.
818 (Kōnin era, year 9) Mannō Pond dam ruptures due to flooding.
821 (Kōnin era, year 12) Kukai is dispatched to oversee renovations of Mannō Pond dam, with construction being completed in approximately 3 months. Between the years of 821 and 1184, the Manno Pond dam collapses and is subsequently restored many times.
1184 (Genryaku era, year 1) After the collapse of the dam in 1184, all rebuilding efforts were abandoned until 1628 (Kan’ei, year 5). During this period, people settled in the basin constructing houses and cultivating fields. The settlement was named Ikeato Mura (After-Pond village).
1628 (Kan’ei era, year 5) By order of Takamatsu Domain daimyō Ikoma Takatoshi the fushin-bugyō Nichijima Hachibe’e begins renovations of the Mannō Pond dam.
1631 (Kan’ei era, year 8) Takamatsu Domain completes renovations of the dam.
1854 (Ansei era, year 1) Dam collapses due to earthquake.
1870 (Meiji era, year 3) Restoration of dam completed. Afterward restorations, the three separate constructions of the Tenkawa headrace began, in order to supplement water intake from the Dokigawa, resulting in an increase of water volume three times.
1996 (Heisei era, year 8) Mannō Pond selected as one of the 100 Soundscapes of Japan by the Ministry of the Environment.
2000 (Heisei era, year 12)  registered as Japanese cultural landmark- (buildings).
2005 Mannō Pond dam receives the Dammed Lake Hyakusen certification from the Dam Watershed Environmental Improvement Center.
2010 Mannō Pond receives the Pond Hyakusen certification from the Japanese Ministry of Agriculture, Forestry, and Fisheries.
2018 Mannō Pond designed a nationally designated Place of Scenic Beauty,

Data

Current data
Dam type: Earth-filled storage dam
Dam height: 32.0m
Dam length: 155.8m
Shore Length: 19.7km
Water volume: 15,400,000 cubic meters
Waterbody surface area: 342.2 acres
Basin Surface area: 348.9 acres
Catchment area: 8004 acres
Tributaries: Kanakura River, Doki River (via the Tenkawa Headrace)

Data from 821 (Konin era, year 12)
Dam height: 22m
Shore length: 10.58km
Waterbody surface area: 200acres
Water volume: 5,000,000 cubic meters
Tributaries: Kanakura river

Data from 1631 (Kan’ei era, year 8)
Dam height: 22.72m
Dam length: 81.81m
Shore length: 8.2km
Regions supplied with water: 128.704 square kilometers between Naka-Gun, Uta-Gun, and Tado-Gun
Tributaries: Kanakura river

Data from various embankment constructions
First embankment construction water volume: 6,678,000 cubic meters
Second embankment construction water volume: 7,800,000 cubic meters
Third embankment construction water volume: 15,400,000 cubic meters

Yuru-Nuki

A "Yuru" is a water reservoir plug. Yuru-Nuki ceremony, which is held on annually on June 15 at Manno Pond, releases water to irrigate fields for the rice-planting season.

Access
Car
From Okayama, Ehime, and Kochi: About 30 minutes from Zentsuji IC of Takamatsu Expressway
From Tokushima: About 55 minutes from Mima IC of Tokushima Expressway
Railway
JR: About 15 minutes by taxi from Kotohira station
Kotoden: About 20 minutes by taxi from Kotoden Kotohira Station / About 15 minutes by taxi from Okada Station
Airplane
Takamatsu Airport: About 55 minutes by taxi

See also
 List of Places of Scenic Beauty of Japan (Kagawa)

References

External links

Official website 

Reservoirs in Japan
Landforms of Kagawa Prefecture
Mannō, Kagawa
Places of Scenic Beauty